Edward N. Peterson (1925–2005) was an American historian and professor at the University of Wisconsin–River Falls from 1954 until his death in 2005.  He earned his Ph.D. in history from the University of Wisconsin–Madison in 1953.  His specialty was German history, particularly the World War II period and the German Democratic Republic, a field in which he wrote a number of books.

Biography
Edward N. Peterson was born on August 27, 1925, in St. Joseph, Missouri, the son of Roscoe D. Peterson and Rachel B. (White) Peterson.

He received his PhD degree from the University of Wisconsin–Madison in 1953. After one year at Eastern Kentucky University in Richmond, Kentucky, he joined the faculty of Wisconsin State College, which became the University of Wisconsin–River Falls.  Starting there in 1954, he taught courses in modern history until March 18, 2005—nearly 51 years. In 1963, he became Chair of the Social Science Department and then chair of the History Department until 1991.

He was also active in the German Studies Association, and was  president and secretary of the Upper Midwest History Conference; Secretary & Treasurer Pierce County Historical Association.  He received research grants from the Alexander von Humboldt Foundation for 1963–64, 1966, 1985; the National Endowment for the Humanities 1969–70, and the Social Science Research Council 1970–71.   He supported wife Ursula's writings and publications on the History of River Falls and Pierce County, as well as her research into family history.

Drafted into the U.S. Army on March 28, 1944.  He served in the Anti-tank Platoon, 1st Battalion, 274th Infantry Regiment, of the 70th Infantry Division (United States), and was sent to Europe on December 1, 1944. He was at the Front on the Rhine River by Christmas 1944, part of the 7th and later the 3rd Armies.

Books
 Peterson, Edward N. (1954) Hjalmar Schacht, For and Against Hitler Boston: Christopher Publishing House, 
 Peterson, Edward N. (1969) The Limits of Hitler's Power Princeton, N.J., Princeton University Press, 1969, 
 Peterson, Edward N. (1978) The American Occupation of Germany: Retreat to Victory Wayne State University Press; Detroit, MI; 1977; 376 p.; .
 Peterson, Edward N. (1990) The Many Faces of Defeat, the German People's Experience in 1945 Peter Lang Publishing,  / US-
 Peterson, Edward N. (1995) An Analytical History of World War II, Volume 1 | Volume 2 Peter Lang Publishing,  & 
 Peterson, Edward N. (1998) Russian Command, German Resistance Peter Lang Publishing, 
 Peterson, Edward N. (2002) The Secret Police and the Revolution: The Fall of the German Democratic Republic Praeger Publishers, 
 Peterson, Edward N. (2004) The Limits of Secret Police Power: The Magdeburger Stasi, 1953-1989 Peter Lang Publishing,

References 
 Peterson, Edward N. (2004) The Limits of Secret Police Power: The Magdeburger Stasi, 1953-1989 Peter Lang Publishing.

External links
Clips from speech given at December 18, 2004, graduation at the University of Wisconsin–River Falls 
 Clip #1 | Clip #2 | Clip #3 | Text of Commencement Address

In the newspaper
 Prince of Serendip | Teaching Award | Funeral | Obituary

1925 births
2005 deaths
20th-century American historians
20th-century American male writers
Historians of Nazism
20th-century American educators
University of Wisconsin–Madison alumni
University of Wisconsin–River Falls faculty
Eastern Kentucky University faculty
Historians of Germany
American male non-fiction writers